Mustafa Kapı (born 8 August 2002) is a Turkish professional footballer who plays as a midfielder for Süper Lig club Adana Demirspor.

Club career

Galatasaray 
Kapı made his professional debut with Galatasaray in a 4–2 Süper Lig win over Sivasspor on 23 December 2018. In doing so, Kapı became the youngest footballer in Galatasaray's history, at the age of 16.

Lille 
On 12 September 2020, Lille announced the transfer of Kapı.

Adana Demirspor 
On 7 January 2022, Adana Demirspor announced the transfer of Kapı. He signed on a contract running until 30 June 2025.

Honours
Galatasaray
 Süper Lig: 2018–19

References

External links
 
 
 

2002 births
Living people
Sportspeople from Denizli
Turkish footballers
Turkey youth international footballers
Association football midfielders
Galatasaray S.K. footballers
Lille OSC players
Adana Demirspor footballers
Süper Lig players
Championnat National 3 players
Turkish expatriate footballers
Expatriate footballers in France
Turkish expatriate sportspeople in France